John Henry Moss Stadium is a baseball stadium home to the Gardner-Webb University Runnin' Bulldogs. It was officially completed on September 18, 2010. The first regular season game played there was February 22, 2011.  It has a capacity of about 700, but can be expanded. John Henry Moss was born in Kings Mountain, North Carolina, and was president of the South Atlantic League for 50 years. He was the youngest person to be a president of a professional baseball league, taking over the Western Carolina League in 1948 at the age of 29.

See also
 List of NCAA Division I baseball venues

References 

Baseball venues in North Carolina
Sports venues completed in 2010
Buildings and structures in Cleveland County, North Carolina
Gardner–Webb Runnin' Bulldogs baseball
2010 establishments in North Carolina
College baseball venues in the United States